Africa Development (Afrique et développement) is the quarterly bilingual journal of CODESRIA published since 1976. It is a social science journal whose major focus is on issues which are central to the development of society. Its principal objective is to provide a forum for the exchange of ideas among African scholars from a variety of intellectual persuasions and various disciplines. The journal also encourages other contributors working on Africa or those undertaking comparative analysis of developing world issues.

Indexing information 
The journal is indexed in International Bibliography of Social Sciences, International African Bibliography, African Studies Abstracts, and Abstracts on Rural Development in the Tropics.

References 

 Electronic Journals Library (EZB)
 AtoZ electronic journals focused on Africa (NAI)
 African Journals OnLine (AJOL)

External links 
 

African studies journals
Publications established in 1976
Academic journals published in Africa
Council for the Development of Social Science Research in Africa academic journals
Multilingual journals